WNJT may refer to:

 WNJT (TV), a television station (channel 52) licensed to Trenton, New Jersey, United States
 WNJT-FM, a radio station (88.1 FM) licensed to Trenton, New Jersey, United States